The uninhabited Triple Islands are an island group located in Bathurst Inlet, south of Victoria Island, west of the Kent Peninsula, in the Kitikmeot Region, Nunavut, Canada. Other island groups in the vicinity include the Breakwater Islands, Chapman Islands, Cockburn Islands, Entry Islands, Piercey Islands, Porden Islands, and Wilmot Islands.

References 

 Triple Islands at the Atlas of Canada

Islands of Bathurst Inlet
Uninhabited islands of Kitikmeot Region